Episyrphus balteatus, sometimes called the marmalade hoverfly, is a relatively small hoverfly (9–12 mm) of the Syrphidae family, widespread throughout the Palaearctic region, which covers Europe, North Asia, and North Africa. The upper side of the abdomen is patterned with orange and black bands. Two further identification characters are the presence of secondary black bands on the third and fourth dorsal plates and faint greyish longitudinal stripes on the thorax. Its color patterns may appear wasp-like to other animals, such as birds, protecting it from predation.

Episyrphus balteatus can be found throughout the year in various habitats, including urban gardens, visiting flowers for pollen and nectar. They often form dense migratory swarms, which may cause panic among people for their resemblance to wasps. It is among the very few species of flies capable of crushing pollen grains and feeding on them. The larva is terrestrial and feeds on aphids.

As in most other hoverflies, males can be easily identified by their holoptic eyes, i.e., left and right compound eyes touching at the top of their heads.

Gallery

References

Verrall, G.H. (1901). British flies, vol. 8: Platypezidae, Pipunculidae and Syrphidae of Great Britain, reprint, 1969, E. W. Classey, Hampton.
Chiney, Michael (2007), Insects of Britain and Western Europe. Domino Guides, A&C Black, London

External links
 
 External images

Syrphini
Diptera of Africa
Diptera of Asia
Diptera of Europe
Insects described in 1776
Taxa named by Charles De Geer